"My World" is a 1972 single released by the Bee Gees. It was originally released as a non-album single on 14 January 1972 worldwide. but was later included on the compilation Best of Bee Gees, Volume 2 in 1973. The flip side of the single was "On Time", a country rock number composed by Maurice Gibb. "My World" reached the Top 20 in both US and UK.

Writing and recording
"My World" was written in the backstage of ITV's The Golden Shot with some of the same musical ideas as "How Can You Mend a Broken Heart". Maurice said "Whether something is a soft ballad or an uptempo thing, we would record it if we thought it was going to make a good single".  By October 13, the band recorded had "My World" along with unreleased tracks, "What Could Have Been Done" and "Goodbye Blue Sky". The song is played through twice. Barry Gibb explains "My World": "it's not from the album, followed along some of the same musical ideas as 'How Can You Mend a Broken Heart'". As Robin Gibb states in the liner notes of Tales from the Brothers Gibb, "One rollicking little jaunt that me and the lads came up with in downtown Birmingham, England, whilst doing a television show called Golden Shot, the ensuing results being that it went on to be a huge top 20 hit in the UK and the US that left the three of us 'drooling' with pleasure."

It was the last single released by the band with Geoff Bridgford as well as the single cover as he left in March that year.

Release
The music video featured the group in a recording studio. Barry Gibb was shown without his trademark beard, like he does in the group's later videos for "Night Fever" and the alternate videos of "How Deep Is Your Love" and "Stayin' Alive" as well as the video for his 1984 solo single "Fine Line".

"My World" also reached #15 in Cash Box in two weeks.

Personnel
Barry Gibb – lead vocal, guitar
Robin Gibb – lead vocal
Maurice Gibb – backing vocal, bass, piano, guitar
Geoff Bridgford – drums
Alan Kendall – guitar

Chart performance

Year-end charts

References

Bee Gees songs
Demis Roussos songs
1972 songs
Songs written by Barry Gibb
Songs written by Robin Gibb
Song recordings produced by Robert Stigwood
Song recordings produced by Barry Gibb
Song recordings produced by Robin Gibb
Song recordings produced by Maurice Gibb
1972 singles
Rock ballads